Bulbophyllum vaginatum is a species of orchid.

Bulbophyllum vaginatum contains the two phenanthrenes 4,9-dimethoxyphenanthrene-2,5-diol and 4,6-dimethoxyphenanthrene-2,3,7-triol, and the two dihydrophenanthrenes 4-methoxy-9,10-dihydrophenanthrene-2,3,7-triol and 4,6-dimethoxy-9,10-dihydrophenanthrene-2,3,7-triol.

References

vaginatum